Marićevića jaruga ("Marićević Gully"), in Orašac, Aranđelovac, Serbia, is a memorial complex at the site where the First Serbian Uprising was agreed upon on 15 February 1804 and Karađorđe Petrović was chosen as the leader of the uprising (Orašac Assembly). Marićevića jaruga is visited every year by high-ranking Serbian state officials because the date when the rebellion started, 15 February, is celebrated as the day the modern Serbian state was founded. To commemorate the events related to the start of the uprising, the church in Orašac was built between 1868 and 1870, a Memorial School was built in 1932, a memorial fountain was built in the trench in 1954 to mark the sesquicentennial of the event, and a monument to Karađorđe Petrović was erected in 2004 to commemorate the bicentennial of the uprising. The sculptor Drinka Radovanović created the monument from white Aranđelovac marble. In 1979 Marićević Trench was added to the Historic Landmarks of Exceptional Importance list.

See also
 First Serbian Uprising
 Historic Landmarks of Exceptional Importance

External links
 Marićevića jaruga at www.spomenicikulture.mi.sanu.ac.rs

First Serbian Uprising
Monuments and memorials in Serbia
Historic Landmarks of Exceptional Importance
Fountains in Serbia